Goiabeira is a municipality in the state of Minas Gerais in the Southeast region of Brazil.  As of 2020, its estimated population is 3,378.

See also
List of municipalities in Minas Gerais

References

External links

Municipalities in Minas Gerais